Americus Gabe Lancione (February 12, 1907 – November 5, 1989) was a Democratic member of the Ohio House of Representatives from Belmont County, Ohio, who served as Speaker of the Ohio House of Representatives from 1973-1975. A portion of Route 7 in Bellaire, OH is dedicated to his service and is known as the A.G. Lancione Memorial Highway.

References

Speakers of the Ohio House of Representatives
Democratic Party members of the Ohio House of Representatives
1907 births
1989 deaths
20th-century American politicians